Schildts Förlags Ab was a Swedish-language book publisher in Finland. The publisher published textbooks as well as fiction and non-fiction. The head office was in Helsinki and there was a branch located in Vaasa. The publisher was owned by Svenska Folkskolans Vänner. On 1 February 2012, Schildts and Söderströms merged into one publishing house, Schildts & Söderströms.

After an apprenticeship at his uncle's bookstore,  founded a publishing house in Porvoo in 1913, which was reorganized into Holger Schildts Förlags AB in 1919. In 1991, the publishing house merged with Editum, which published textbooks. Among the publisher's fiction writers, Tove Jansson is internationally known; her Moomin series was published by the company. Since 1987 it has also published Finnish-language literature, mainly translations but also original Finnish titles later on. A Finnish editorial office was established in 1996.

The publisher's annual output was 30–40 titles for the general editorial staff, some 30 textbooks, 20–30 Finnish books, and partial editions from Sweden. The range included fiction, nonfiction, children's books and encyclopedias, including the encyclopedia Uppslagsverket Finland. In nonfiction, Schildts focused on cultural history in a broad sense. The proportion of nonfiction, novels and poetry was around 40–40–20, but varied from year to year. Typically between two and five debut authors were published each year, while around 150 first-time manuscripts were received.

References

External links 

 Schildts förlags Ab in Uppslagsverket Finland (online edition, 2012). CC-BY-SA 4.0
 Schildts & Söderströms' website

Finland Swedish
Book publishing companies of Finland
Finnish companies established in 1913